RD (or Raia Drogasil) is the largest drugstore company in Latin America by revenue and market capitalization. With its headquarters are in São Paulo, it has more than 2.500 stores in 24 Brazilian states.

The company operates 2.500 stores branded as Droga Raia, Drogasil and 4Bio, and has 11 distribution centers. It also operates online through its Droga Raia, Drogasil and Onofre brands. 

RD's main competitors include Grupo DPSP, Pague Menos, Extrafarma, and Profarma.

History 

The company was founded in 2011 before the merger of drugstore companies "Raia" and "Drogasil" both listed in São Paulo Stock Exchange. In 2015 the company entered to Ibovespa the main Brazilian stock Index and in 2017 changed your corporate brand from RaiaDrogasil to simply RD.

References

External links
 Company website 
 Raia
 Drogasil
 4bio

Companies based in São Paulo
Pharmacies of Brazil
Companies listed on B3 (stock exchange)